The parvorder Catarrhini , catarrhine monkeys, Old World anthropoids, or Old World monkeys, consisting of the Cercopithecoidea and apes (Hominoidea). In 1812, Geoffroy grouped those two groups together and established the name Catarrhini, "Old World monkeys", ("singes de l'Ancien Monde" in French). Its sister in the infraorder Simiiformes is the parvorder Platyrrhini (New World monkeys). There has been some resistance to directly designate apes (and thus humans) as monkeys despite the scientific evidence, so "Old World monkey" may be taken to mean the Cercopithecoidea or the Catarrhini. That apes are monkeys was already realized by Georges-Louis Leclerc, Comte de Buffon in the 18th century. Linnaeus placed this group in 1758 together with what we now recognise as the tarsiers and the New World monkeys, in a single genus "Simia" (sans Homo). The Catarrhini are all native to Africa and Asia. Members of this parvorder are called catarrhines.

The Catarrhini are the sister group to the New World monkeys, the Platyrrhini. Some  six million years before the ape - Cercopithecoidea bifurcation, the Platyrrhini emerged within "monkeys" by migration to South America from Afro-Arabia (the Old World), likely by ocean.

Description
The technical distinction between the New World platyrrhines and Old World catarrhines is the shape of their noses. The platyrrhines (from Ancient Greek platy-, "flat", and rhin-, "nose") have nostrils which face sideways. The catarrhines (from Ancient Greek katà-, "down", and rhin-, "nose") have nostrils that face downwards.

Most catarrhine species show considerable sexual dimorphism and do not form a pair bond. Most, but not all, species live in social groups. Like the platyrrhines, the catarrhines are generally diurnal, and have grasping hands and (with the exception of bipedal humans) grasping feet.

The apes – in both traditional and phylogenic nomenclature – are exclusively catarrhine species. In traditional usage, ape describes any tailless, larger, and more typically ground-dwelling species of catarrhine. "Ape" may be found as part of the common name of such species, such as the Barbary ape. In phylogenic usage, the term ape applies only to the superfamily Hominoidea. This grouping comprises the two families Hylobatidae, the lesser apes or gibbons, and Hominidae, the great apes, including orangutans, gorillas, chimpanzees, bonobos, humans, and related extinct genera, such as the prehuman australopithecines and the giant orangutan relative Gigantopithecus.

Classification and evolution
According to Schrago & Russo, New World monkeys split from their Old World kin about 35 million years ago (Mya). They use the major catarrhine division between cercopithecoids and hominoids of about 25 Mya (which they argue is strongly supported by the fossil evidence), as a calibration point, and from this also calculate the gibbons separating from the great apes (including humans) about 15-19 Mya.

According to Begun and Harrison, the Catarrhini split from their New World monkey kin about 44 - 40 Mya, with the first catarrhines appearing in Africa and Arabia, and not appearing in Eurasia (outside Arabia) until 18-17 Mya.

Catarrhini lost the enzyme Alpha-galactosidase, present in all other mammal lineages, sometime after the split from platyrrhini. It is hypothesized that an ancient pathogen containing Alpha-galactosidase may be responsible, as only individuals with mutations that "turned off" the gene for Alpha-galactosidase would have produced antibodies against the pathogen and survived.

The distinction between apes and monkeys is complicated by the traditional paraphyly of monkeys: apes emerged as a sister group of Old World monkeys in the catarrhines, which are a sister group of New World monkeys. Therefore, cladistically, apes, catarrhines and related contemporary extinct groups such as Parapithecidae are monkeys as well, for any consistent definition of "monkey". "Old World Monkey" may also legitimately be taken to be meant to include all the catarrhines, including apes and extinct species such as Aegyptopithecus, in which case the apes, Cercopithecoidea and Aegyptopithecus emerged within the Old World Monkeys. Although the colloquial usage of terms like ape and monkey in English reflects a misconception about their true biological relationship, this is not the case in some other languages; for example, in Russian, the same term is used to describe all simians, both with and without tails, including apes.
 Order Primates
 Suborder Strepsirrhini: lemurs, lorises, etc.
 Suborder Haplorhini: tarsiers + monkeys, including apes
 Infraorder Tarsiiformes
 Family Tarsiidae: tarsiers
 Infraorder Simiiformes : simians (monkeys, including apes), or higher primates
Parvorder Catarrhini
 Superfamily †Propliopithecoidea
 Family †Propliopithecidae (includes Aegyptopithecus)
 Superfamily †Pliopithecoidea
 Family †Dionysopithecidae 
 Family †Pliopithecidae 
 Superfamily †Dendropithecoidea
 Family †Dendropithecidae
 Superfamily †Saadanioidea
 Family †Saadaniidae
 Superfamily Cercopithecoidea
 Family Cercopithecidae
 Superfamily Hominoidea : apes 
 Family Hylobatidae: gibbons
 Family Hominidae: great apes (including humans)
 Parvorder Platyrrhini: New World monkeys

Cladogram
Below is a cladogram with extinct species in which the crown Catharrhini, which emerged in the Propliopithecoidea. Also, Saadanioidea is sister of the Cercopithecoidea rather than of the Crown Catarrhini here.  It is indicated how many million years ago (Mya) the clades diverged into newer clades.

The Platyrrhini may have emerged in e.g. the Oligopithecidae. The Saadanioidea may be sister to the Propliopithecoidea s.s., and Micropithecus may be sister to the Taqah Propliopithecids.

References

 
Monkeys
Extant Eocene first appearances
Taxa named by Étienne Geoffroy Saint-Hilaire
Taxa described in 1812